The Caproni Ca.120 was a three-engine monoplane bomber built by Caproni in the 1930s.

Design
The Ca.120 was a trimotor monoplane with a cantilevered high-wing configuration made of wood with two side members, equipped with compensated flaps and ailerons. The fuel tanks were placed between the two wing members. The wing lining was in plywood on the leading edge and in canvas for the remaining part. The fuselage, on the other hand, was made of welded steel tubes and presented the seat of the two pilots side by side on the leading edge of the wings. In addition, the wide fuselage behind the cockpit allowed a wide stowage of materials. The pointer was placed in front of a large glazed window under the seats of the two pilots. The central engine was placed at the front of the fuselage, which ended with adjustable tail empennage. The two wheels equipped with brakes were placed on amortized carriages placed under the side engines that were fixed to the wings at the front. The carriages were single axle with elastic strut and bracing on the main nodes of the fuselage. The rear wheel was amortized and adjustable.

Specifications

References

Ca.120
1930s Italian bomber aircraft
High-wing aircraft
Trimotors